Border Law is a 1931 American pre-Code Western film directed by Louis King and starring Buck Jones. The film was remade as Whistlin' Dan (1932) and again with Buck Jones as The Fighting Ranger (1934).

Premise
Captain Wilks (F.R. Smith) of the Texas Rangers orders Jim Houston (Buck Jones) and his crew, Thunder Rogers (Frank Rice) and Jim's brother Bob (Don Chapman), to go to Eureka, Texas to break up the Shag Smith (Jim Mason) gang.

The film was based on a story by Stuart Anthony.

Cast
 Buck Jones as Jim Houston 
 Lupita Tovar as Tonita
 Jim Mason as Shag Smith (as James Mason)
 Frank Rice as Thunder Rogers 
 Don Chapman as Bob Houston - Texas Ranger
 Lou Hicks as Dave (as Louis Hickus)
 F. R. Smith as Captain John Wilkes 
 John Wallace as Pegleg

Soundtrack
 Frank Rice - "If You Fall in Love"
 Lupita Tovar - "Adios Amigo"

References

External links
 
 
 
 
 

1931 films
1930s English-language films
1930s Spanish-language films
American black-and-white films
Columbia Pictures films
1931 Western (genre) films
American Western (genre) films
Films set in Texas
1931 multilingual films
American multilingual films
Films directed by Louis King
1930s American films